Robert Bruce Hegyes (pronounced Hedyesh; May 7, 1951 – January 26, 2012) was an American actor best known for his portrayal of high school student Juan Epstein on the 1970s American sitcom Welcome Back, Kotter and as detective Manny Esposito on the 1980s American crime drama Cagney & Lacey. He was the cousin of rock musician Jon Bon Jovi.

Early life
Hegyes was born in Perth Amboy, New Jersey, to a Hungarian-American father, Stephen, and an Italian-American mother, Marie Dominica Cocozza. Hegyes was the oldest of four siblings (Mark, Stephanie, and Elizabeth).

He grew up in Metuchen, New Jersey, and began acting in high school in the mid-1960s under the guidance of Metuchen High School theater teacher, Barton Shepard. Hegyes attended Glassboro State College after graduating from high school.  While there, he worked part-time at the Hardee's fast food restaurant in town.  Upon graduation from Glassboro State College (now Rowan University) where he completed his student teaching requirement at 
Haddon Township High School, with a Bachelor of Arts in Speech/Theater and Secondary Education, Hegyes ventured to New York City to pursue a career in acting and soon became a member of a Greenwich Village children's theater group called "Theater in a Trunk," performing educational theater at U.S. President Theodore Roosevelt's birthplace, on East 20th Street. Hegyes continued performing in the Village in educational children's theater, this time as a puppeteer with an arm and rod puppet company, playing Mr. Toad in The Wind in the Willows. Robert managed to work a third performing job in Washington Square Park and at the Provincetown Playhouse as a member of the political improvisational guerrilla troupe, "Jack LaRumpa's Flying Drum & Kazoo Band."

Career

Within a year of graduating from college, Hegyes was cast to co-star in the highly acclaimed Off Broadway drama Naomi Court, starring actor Brad Davis (star of Midnight Express). After completing the successful Manhattan Theater Club engagement, Hegyes was cast by Tony Award- winning actor Len Cariou (making his directing debut) to co-star in the Broadway drama, Don't Call Back, starring Arlene Francis and Dorian Harewood. While performing on Broadway, Hegyes auditioned for television producer James Komack and was cast to star in what was to become the award-winning ABC comedy, Welcome Back, Kotter.  Hegyes portrayed the character of Juan Luis Pedro Felipo de Huevos Epstein (typically referred to as simply "Epstein").  The show lasted four seasons, from 1975 to 1979.  Hegyes became one of the show's directors at age 25.

While on the show, he was the key force of the winning tug-of-war team on the 1976 edition of Battle of the Network Stars.

Hegyes guest starred in more than thirty television shows, including Saturday Night Live, NewsRadio, Diagnosis: Murder, The Drew Carey Show, and The Streets of San Francisco. He also appeared in the award-winning Volkswagen Passat commercial "The Chase" for director Kinka Usher. Hegyes appeared in Honeymoon Hotel, Underground Aces, Bob Roberts, The Purpose, and Bar Hopping.

Hegyes made his Los Angeles stage debut as "Chico Marx" in the Westwood and national touring company engagements of An Evening with Groucho. Upon returning from the tour, Hegyes was cast by producer Barney Rosenzweig to star as a series regular portraying undercover detective "Manny Esposito" in Cagney & Lacey.  During this time he also appeared on the game show Pyramid from time to time, and on Match Game.

Hegyes became "Artist-in-Residence" at his alma mater, Rowan University, teaching screenplay writing, acting for camera and public speaking, and was a guest lecturer in the Radio/Television/Film & Theater Departments. He was an adjunct instructor at Brooks College in Long Beach, California, where he taught essay writing and public speaking. Hegyes was a California Certified Secondary Education teacher, but had worked infrequently in recent years. 

Having returned to live in his hometown of Metuchen, New Jersey in 2009, Hegyes made his last public appearance in early January 2012, reprising his "An Evening with Groucho" role as Chico Marx, this time in three performances of "The Marx Brothers: Flywheel, Shyster and Flywheel," a staged radio play re-creating several episodes of the early-1930s broadcasts.

Personal life
Hegyes was married to Mary Kunes (1973–1977). He then married Kyle Drummer (1979–1984).  With his third wife Lynn O'Hare (1987–1993), he had two children, Cassondra (Cassie) (born 1987) and Mack (born 1991). Hegyes was in a long-term relationship with Cynthia Wylie (1994–2007), who brought two children to the relationship, Alex (born 1988) and Sophia (born 1991) He was the cousin of rock singer Jon Bon Jovi and opera singer Mario Lanza.

Death
On January 26, 2012, after suffering from chest pains at his home in Metuchen, New Jersey, Hegyes died from an apparent heart attack at John F. Kennedy Medical Center in Edison, New Jersey, at age 60.

Filmography

Film

Television

References

External links 

1951 births
2012 deaths
Male actors from New Jersey
American male film actors
American people of Hungarian descent
American people of Italian descent
American male television actors
Metuchen High School alumni
People from Metuchen, New Jersey
People from Perth Amboy, New Jersey
Rowan University alumni
American male stage actors
20th-century American male actors